Pterolophia albivenosa is a species of beetle in the family Cerambycidae. It was described by Francis Polkinghorne Pascoe in 1865. It is known from Vietnam, Java, Borneo, Sumatra, and Malaysia.

References

albivenosa
Beetles described in 1865